Beeroth may refer to:

 Beeroth (biblical city), a town near Jerusalem named in the Bible
 Be'eroth Bene-Jaakan, also known as Be'eroth, a site mentioned in the biblical story of the Exodus
 Beirut, capital of Lebanon
 "Beeroth", a track from the album Masada: Hei by Masada